The Under 17 Car Club is a club where people under the age of 17 can drive motor vehicles.  It was started in 1976 by author Sandy Barrie who realised there was no opportunity for youngsters under seventeen to drive cars. The Club is run entirely by volunteers with no full or part-time paid staff.

The aim of the club is "to enable under age drivers to practice and improve their driving skills legally and safely, in a variety of different vehicles, under properly supervised conditions, and to take an active interest in cars and motor sport and ultimately to produce safer young drivers on our roads at age 17 and beyond".

Grading system
The club has a grading system, designed to help members progress to driving test standard.

Ungraded - On first joining you are ungraded
Grade 5 - After taking a skills test and passing you become grade 5 and can go forwards and backwards competently
Grade 4 - You have mastered manoeuvres and roundabouts
Grade 3 - Your driving is smooth and safe and you have good car control
Grade 2 - Your driving shows finesse, you can drive a car at motorway speeds safely and are at the driving test standard
Grade 1 - You are competent at all aspects of motoring including mechanics
Grade X - You show outstanding skill at driving and are an exceptionally safe driver

Activities
The club offers many activities at different venues, including:

Skill Tests
Skid Pans
Advanced Driving
Truck Day
Magic Day - where they raise money for the Teenage Cancer Trust. The Club has so far raised over £60,000 for TCT.
Motorway Driving
Speed Awareness
Peer Pressure / Distracted Driving
Team Challenge
Caterham Day
4x4 Day

Meeting places
The Club use a variety of venues throughout the year to provide the best possible range of driving experience to Members. The number of events at each site is subject to availability. The locations of the current venues are below:

 Castle Combe Circuit
 Bovington Tank Proving Ground
 Kempton Park Racecourse
MOD Lyneham
Fire Service College, Moreton-in-Marsh
Saffron Walden (Debden)
Three Counties Showground, Malvern
Seighford, Staffordshire
Science and Technology Park in Berkeley Gloucestershire

Well known members
One of the most famous members of the club was Richard Burns, who joined the club in 1982, and went on to become the first Englishman to win the World Rally Championship in 2001. Burns was patron of the club until his death in 2005.

References

External links 
 http://www.under17-carclub.co.uk - Main Club Website
 http://www.under17driver.co.uk - Pathfinder Programme Website
 http://www.u17ccctrust.org - Charitable Trust Website

Under 17 Car Club
Youth organisations based in the United Kingdom